Martin Damm and Robert Lindstedt were the defending champions. Both are present, but chose not compete together this year.
Damm partnered up with Filip Polášek, but they lost in the semifinals 6–7(4–7), 4–6, against Jürgen Melzer and Philipp Petzschner.
Lindstedt partnered up with Julian Knowle, but they lost 3–6, 6–7(6–8), against Christopher Kas and Evgeny Korolev in the first round.
Jürgen Melzer and Philipp Petzschner won this tournament, after won in the final 3–6, 6–3, [10–8], against Arnaud Clément and Olivier Rochus.

Seeds

Draw

Draw

External links
 Main Draw Doubles

PBZ Zagreb Indoors - Doubles
Zagreb Indoors
2010 PBZ Zagreb Indoors